Dmitry Chaplin ( Dmitry Alexandrovich Chaplin) is a Russian dancer, choreographer, and actor, best known for being a Top 10 finalist on the second season of the dance competition series So You Think You Can Dance. While competing on the series, he became known for performing shirtless, with one solo routine having him rip off his shirt. In 2009, Chaplin was nominated for a Primetime Emmy Award for his choreography.

Early life and education 
Dmitry Chaplin was born in Rostov-on-Don, Russia, on July 14, 1982. As of 2020, he lives in Los Angeles, California. He graduated from School #8 in Rostov-on-Don, and Minnetonka High School in Minnetonka, Minnesota, and attended Brooklyn College in Brooklyn, New York for one semester.

Career 
Chaplin partnered with Heidi Groskreutz and was a national finalist in U.S. National Amateur Dancesport Championships in Provo, Utah that occurred on March 11, 2006.  His dancing coach since 2004 has been Louis van Amstel, who was partnered with actress Lisa Rinna on the U.S. show Dancing with the Stars that time.

In 2006, Chaplin was part of the top twenty contestants cast on Season 2 of So You Think You Can Dance.  His dance style was categorized as extremely masculine, and several episodes of the show featured parodies with other male contestants seeking Chaplin's advice.

As a recurring theme, Chaplin would expose his chest while dancing; during one of his later performances, he deliberately teased the judges with an ending where he kept his shirt on.

Chaplin has stated,

The judges generally rated his dancing positively, but call-in votes still repeatedly placed him in the bottom three couples each week. Two of his first partners, Joy Spears, and Aleksandra Wojda were eliminated consecutively, and a third, Ashlee Nino, after two weeks together, so he was labeled as being cursed. Chaplin was partnered with Donyelle Jones during the July 19 show, when all the contestants switched partners.  On the results show of July 20, it was revealed that Donyelle had "beaten the curse", but Chaplin was unable to beat it himself; he was eliminated along with Martha Nichols. Chaplin was on the Season 2 U.S. live tour, and performed before sold-out audiences with his fellow finalists.

For Season 3, Chaplin made an appearance as Mary Murphy's assistant for the Latin dance portion of the Las Vegas eliminations.

On May 3, 2007, Chaplin made a special performance before the results were announced on the So You Think You Can Dance (Malaysia, Season 1).

On July 25, 2007, Chaplin, assisted by Heidi Groskreutz, choreographed a Samba routine for contestants Lacey Schwimmer and Danny Tidwell.

On July 23, 2008, for Season 4, Chaplin choreographed an Argentine Tango routine for contestants Chelsie Hightower and Joshua Allen which earned him an Emmy nomination.

On August 7, 2008, Chaplin partnered judge Mary Murphy in a surprise Samba on the Season 4 finale.

October, 2008: (So You Think You Can Dance Holland), Chaplin choreographed a Samba routine for contestants Sigourney and Ivan and a Rumba routine for contestants Annemiek and Timor.

On October 29, 2008, Chaplin choreographed a Samba routine for contestants of So You Think You Can Dance Canada, Vincent-Oliver Noiseux and Lisa Auguste. On November 5, 2008, Chaplin choreographed a Jive routine for contestants of So You Think You Can Dance Canada, Izaak Smith and Kaitlyn Fitzgerald. On December 5, 2008, Chaplin choreographed a Paso Doble routine for Top 4 contestants of  Танцюють Всi (Ukrainian So You Think You Can Dance), Alexander Ostanin and Mariyam Turkmenbaev.

After So You Think You Can Dance
After the So You Think You Can Dance Tour, Dmitry moved to Los Angeles to pursue a career in show business.  He has also taught dance classes at Mary Murphy's Champion Ballroom Academy.

On June 30, 2007, Dmitry was the only So You Think You Can Dance participant to appear on the Reality All-Stars fund raising event.

In March 2008 he served as a judge at the Broadway Dreams Dance Competition in Niagara Falls, Canada.

On April 9, 2008, Dmitry performed together with professional dancer Fabienne Liechti in the Idol Gives Back fund-raiser on Fox's American Idol.

Chaplin was selected to be a professional on season 8 of Dancing with the Stars. While he was originally supposed to have Jewel as his celebrity partner, she withdrew because of fractured tibias in both legs; his partner ended up being Holly Madison. Madison and Chaplin were eliminated in the fourth week of the competition. This was not, however, Chaplin's first DWTS appearance: when Aretha Franklin appeared as a guest performer in season 7, Chaplin performed a routine with other DWTS performers Karina Smirnoff, Anna Trebunskaya, and Louis van Amstel. Chaplin finished in 2nd place in season 9 of Dancing with the Stars with singer, Mýa. He most recently competed on season 12 of Dancing with the Stars with supermodel Petra Němcová. They were the fourth couple eliminated on April 19, 2011.

Dmitry choreographed Chelsie Hightower and Joshua Allen in an Argentine Tango to "A Los Amigos" from the Forever Tango soundtrack in July 2008; a year later he was nominated for a Primetime Emmy Award for Outstanding Choreography.

On August 28, 2018, Dmitry began to dance in the Ukrainian version of the show Dancing with the Stars. His star partner is a Ukrainian X-Factor and Ukraine's Got Talent Host Oksana Marchenko.

Dancing With The Stars USA

Dancing With The Stars Ukraine

With Holly Madison
Average: 17.3
Placed: 11th

With Mýa
Average: 27.3
Placed: 2nd

 Baz Luhrmann was a guest judge for Week 2

With Petra Němcová
Average: 21.2
Placed: 8th

With Oksana Marchenko 
Average: 19.4
Placed: 7th

Awards and achievements

2009 EMMY Nomination for Outstanding Choreography
US National Latin Finalist with Heidi Groskreutz Burns
Dancing With The Stars Runner Up with celebrity partner Mya
Top 10 of So You Think You Can Dance Season 2

See also
So You Think You Can Dance (U.S.)
So You Think You Can Dance (Season 2)
So You Think You Can Dance (Season 3)
So You Think You Can Dance (Season 4)
Dancing with the Stars (U.S. TV series)
Dancing with the Stars (U.S. season 8)
Dancing with the Stars (U.S. season 9)
Dancing with the Stars (U.S. season 12)

References

External links

 Profile on Fox's So You Think You Can Dance page
Official Website
 Video interview and dance clips on Access Hollywood

1982 births
Living people
Russian emigrants to the United States
Russian male dancers
American ballroom dancers
So You Think You Can Dance (American TV series) contestants
So You Think You Can Dance choreographers
21st-century American dancers
Brooklyn College alumni